Tama Maru may refer to the following ships:
 , Japanese World War II-era auxiliary minesweeper
 , Japanese World War II-era auxiliary minesweeper
 , Japanese World War II-era auxiliary minesweeper
 , Japanese World War II-era auxiliary minesweeper
 , Japanese World War II-era auxiliary minesweeper
 , Japanese World War II-era auxiliary minesweeper
 , Japanese World War II-era auxiliary minesweeper

Ship names